Grand County is a county located in the U.S. state of Colorado. As of the 2020 census, the population was 15,717. The county seat is Hot Sulphur Springs.

History
When Grand County was created February 2, 1874 it was carved out of Summit County and contained land to the western and northern borders of the state, which is in present-day Moffat County and Routt County. It was named after Grand Lake and the Grand River, an old name for the upper Colorado River, which has its headwaters in the county. On January 29, 1877, Routt County was created and Grand County shrunk down to its current western boundary.  When valuable minerals were found in North Park, Grand County claimed the area as part of its county, a claim Larimer County also held. It took a decision by the Colorado Supreme Court in 1886 to declare North Park part of Larimer County, setting Grand County's northern boundary.

Geography

Adjacent counties

 Larimer County - northeast
 Gilpin County - east
 Boulder County - east
 Clear Creek County - southeast
 Summit County - south
 Eagle County - southwest
 Jackson County - north
 Routt County - west

Major Highways
  U.S. Highway 34
  U.S. Highway 40
  State Highway 9
  State Highway 125
  State Highway 134

National protected areas

 Arapaho National Forest
 Arapaho National Recreation Area
 Byers Peak Wilderness
 Continental Divide National Scenic Trail
 Indian Peaks Wilderness
 Never Summer Wilderness
 Ptarmigan Peak Wilderness
 Rocky Mountain National Park

 Routt National Forest
 Sarvis Creek Wilderness
 Vasquez Peak Wilderness

Bicycle routes
 Great Parks Bicycle Route
 TransAmerica Trail Bicycle Route

Scenic byways
 Colorado River Headwaters National Scenic Byway
 Trail Ridge Road/Beaver Meadow National Scenic Byway

Demographics
At the 2000 census there were 12,442 people in 5,075 households, including 3,217 families, in the county.  The population density was 7 people per square mile (3/km2).  There were 10,894 housing units at an average density of 6 per square mile (2/km2).  The racial makeup of the county was 95.15% White, 0.48% Black or African American, 0.43% Native American, 0.68% Asian, 0.10% Pacific Islander, 2.00% from other races, and 1.15% from two or more races.  4.36% of the population were Hispanic or Latino of any race. 23.8% were of German, 12.6% Irish, 10.0% English and 7.3% American ancestry.
Of the 5,075 households 28.10% had children under the age of 18 living with them, 54.70% were married couples living together, 5.20% had a female householder with no husband present, and 36.60% were non-families. 24.80% of households were one person and 4.80% were one person aged 65 or older.  The average household size was 2.37 and the average family size was 2.85.

The age distribution was 21.80% under the age of 18, 9.00% from 18 to 24, 34.70% from 25 to 44, 26.80% from 45 to 64, and 7.80% 65 or older.  The median age was 37 years. For every 100 females there were 112.70 males.  For every 100 females age 18 and over, there were 115.70 males.

The median household income was $47,759 and the median family income was $55,217. Males had a median income of $34,861 versus $26,445 for females. The per capita income for the county was $25,198.  About 5.40% of families and 7.30% of the population were below the poverty line, including 7.90% of those under age 18 and 6.10% of those age 65 or over.

Politics

Communities

Towns
 Fraser
 Granby
 Grand Lake
 Hot Sulphur Springs
 Kremmling
 Winter Park

Census-designated places
 Parshall
 Tabernash

Other
 Radium

See also
 
 List of counties in Colorado
 Saratoga County, Jefferson Territory
 National Register of Historic Places listings in Grand County, Colorado

References

External links

 
 Arapaho National Recreation Area website
 Colorado County Evolution by Don Stanwyck
 Colorado Historical Society
 Grand County Library District website
 Grand County News website
 Grand County Tourism Board website 
 Town of Hot Sulphur Springs website
 Rocky Mountain National Park website
 Winter Park and Fraser Valley Chamber of Commerce website
 Grand Lake Chamber of Commerce homepage
WorkInGrand Portal

 
Colorado counties
1874 establishments in Colorado Territory
Populated places established in 1874